Paratriathlon at the 2020 Summer Paralympics in Tokyo, Japan, took place at the Odaiba Marine Park. It was the second time that paratriathlon was be scheduled in the Paralympics. Eight events were contested (four events for men and women each); two more events than previously contested at the 2016 Summer Paralympics.

The race course consisted of a 750m swim, 20 km bike ride and 5 km run, the swimming part of the race took place at the Odaiba Bay while the cycling and running courses traveled through the West Promenade district of Odaiba, featuring waterfalls and public gardens.

The 2020 Summer Olympic and Paralympic Games were postponed to 2021 due to the COVID-19 pandemic. They kept the 2020 name and were held from 24 August to 5 September 2021.

Qualification
There were 80 qualified slots in the paratriathlon (36 male, 36 female and 8 gender free). The Paralympic qualification period started on 28 June 2019 and was suspended for a period on 16 March 2020 due to the COVID-19 pandemic which caused the 2020 Summer Paralympics to be postponed to August 2021, the qualification ranking period ended on 15 July 2021.

A qualification slot is allocated to the NPC not to the individual athlete, however in Bipartite Commission Invitation the slot is allocated to the individual athlete not to the NPC.
An NPC can allocate a maximum of two slots per medal event and/or a maximum of sixteen athletes in total. 
The ITU Paralympic Qualification Ranking List, the top nine ranked male or female athletes each obtain one qualification slot in each medal event.

Schedule
All events start at 6:30am and finish at 11:10am (in Japanese Standard Time UTC+9)

Medal summary

Medal table

Medalists

See also
Triathlon at the 2020 Summer Olympics

References

External links
Results book 

2020 Summer Paralympics events
Triathlon competitions in Japan
Paralympics
2020
Paratriathlon at the 2020 Summer Paralympics